The 2017 Cape Verdean Football Championship season was the 38th beginner level (likely amateur) competition of the first-tier football in Cape Verde.  It started on 13 May and finished on 27 August, it started a days later than last season.  Originally to finish on 15 July, instead, it was rescheduled to 27 August.  The championship was governed by the Cape Verdean Football Federation.

Sporting Praia won their 10th and recent national championship title, also it was the club's next in five years. Sporting Praia did not participate in the CAF Champions League competition in 2018, Not even runner up Ultramarina Tarrafal participates in the 2017 CAF Confederation Cup, both of the clubs due to financial concerns, of any club, it is the eighth consecutive time and becomes the recent African nation not to bring a champion to the continentals for the most consecutive years, in the cup competition, Cape Verde is the longest for not bringing a club in Africa lasting for more than 15 years straight, not even the three national cup winners competed. Sporting Praia participated into the 2018 National Championships as champion of the 2017 season.

Overview
The triangular phase started to be used for the 2017 season, it became the fourth time and first with four clubs each and with playoffs.

CS Mindelense was once more the defending team of the title.  A total of 12 clubs participated in the competition, one from each island league and one who won the last season's title.  The top club from each group qualified for the first time as well as the club with the most points of a second position of each group qualified into the semis for the first time.

Sporting Praia defeated Académica Porto Novo in the semis in its two legs, Sporting Praia won the first and the second one was scoreless, on the other Ultramarina defeated Mindelense 2-0 and qualified into the finals without the first leg played.

Six clubs returned again, on the other only AJAC da Calheta de São Miguel was the only first timer in the national championships.

No huge wins dominated a match this season, the highest result was no more than three goals which was a few matches, one of them the Sporting Praia-Ultramarina Tarrafal (São Nicolau) match which Sporting won 3-2. Académica Porto Novo scored the most goals in the regular season numbering 12. Overall Ultramarina Tarrafal (São Nicolau) scored the most goals totaling 16, followed by Sporting Praia with 15.

Delays
One match, between a Santiago North participant and Vulcânicos was delayed as the regional association deducted three points on May 11 where AJAC thought they fielded an ineligible player Marco Aurélio in a match with Juventus Assomada on April 1, they took it to court and on May 17, the FCF kept the result 2-4 and AJAC qualified into the national championships for the first time.  The first round match was rescheduled to May 31.

Another delay occurred in July and was the next such delay in nine years (see 2008 Cape Verdean Football Championships).  The stadium access to Estádio Orlando Rodrigues was locked as the stadium did not have extra keys for the first leg due to an unknown reason. A week later, Mindelense was unofficially awarded 3-0 and the club was still no entrant into the finals.  Ultramarina appealed to the problems with their entry into the stadium.  It caused the next delay of the national championship finals competition in nine years (but not overall).  The first leg was rescheduled, Mindelense did not show up due to unknown reasons and Mindelense-Ultramarina Tarrafal club strength was probably 50/50, it wasn't held into August and after August 13, Mindelense was indeed disqualified and its second leg result was annulled, but several kept it as stood.  As Mindelense lost 0-2 in the second leg and the first leg unheld.  Mindelense was out of the competition and overall was fourth behind Académica Porto Novo.

Finals
The finals featured Ultramarina and Sporting Praia, Ultramarina was the next appearance from São Nicolau in five years to appear in the finals after Atlético Ribeira Brava and the only one from the island who appeared twice.  Sporting Praia regained their failed national title successes, Sporting won all two legs in Tarrafal de São Nicolau and the national capital Praia and went to claimed their 10th and recent title, also it was their next from Santiago South as well as the Santiago Island and Sotavento to win a title along with the national capital Praia.

Participating clubs

 CS Mindelense, winner of the 2016 Cape Verdean Football Championships
 Sport Sal Rei Club, winner of the Boa Vista Island League
 Sporting Clube da Brava, winner of the Brava Island League
 Vulcânicos, winner of the Fogo Premier Division
 Onze Unidos, winner of the Maio Premier Division
 Académico do Aeroporto, winner of the Sal Premier Division
 AJAC da Calheta, winner of the Santiago North Premier Division
 Sporting Clube da Praia, winner of the Santiago South Premier Division 
 Paulense DC, winner of the Santo Antão North Premier Division
 Académica do Porto Novo, winner of the Santo Antão Island League (South) 
 FC Ultramarina, winner of the São Nicolau Island League
 FC Derby, runner up of the São Vicente Premier Division

Information about the clubs

League standings
Group A

Group B

Group C

Best second placed club
The second placed club with the most points (sometimes goals and matches if equal) qualified into the knockout stage.

Results

Final stages

Semi-finals

Finals

Statistics
Highest scoring match: several with 3 goals

See also
2016–17 in Cape Verdean football

Notes

References

External links

2017 Cape Verdean Football Championships at RSSSF

Cape Verdean Football Championship seasons
1
Cape